Terence Duffy (3 May 1922 – 1 October 1985) was a British trade union leader.

Duffy was educated at St Joseph’s RC School, Wolverhampton. He served in the Second World War from 1940 to 1946 in the Royal Leicestershire Regiment assigned to the American 1st Army. He fought at Salerno and Monte Cassino.

He rose in the Amalgamated Union of Engineering Workers, becoming a Divisional Officer in 1969; a member of the Executive Council in 1976; and President in 1978. He was also on the General Council of the Trades Union Congress from  1978 until his death.

References

Presidents of the Amalgamated Engineering Union
1922 births
1986 deaths
People from Wolverhampton
Members of the General Council of the Trades Union Congress
British Army personnel of World War II
Royal Leicestershire Regiment soldiers